Najas graminea, also known as ricefield water-nymph is a species of aquatic plant found in freshwater habitats, especially still or slow-moving waters, like ponds and rice fields. It grows to a maximum length of 30 cm. The flowers are monoecious. The flowering season is from July to September.</ref>

The natural distribution of this annual plant covers most of Africa as well as the Middle East, Central Asia, East Asia, Southeast Asia, New Guinea, New Caledonia and northern Australia. It has  become naturalized in Spain, Italy, Bulgaria, Crimea and California. This plant is also commercialized in the aquarium trade.

References

External links
Jepson Manual Treatment
Najas graminea

graminea
Aquatic plants
Flora of Africa
Flora of temperate Asia
Flora of tropical Asia
Flora of the Northern Territory
Flora of Western Australia
Plants described in 1813